Elsternwick is an inner suburb in Melbourne, Victoria, Australia, 9 km south-east of Melbourne's Central Business District, located within the City of Glen Eira local government area. Elsternwick recorded a population of 10,887 at the 2021 census.

Administrative division

In terms of its cadastral division, Elsternwick is in the parish of Prahran within the County of Bourke.

Location

Elsternwick is bounded by the Nepean Highway, Elster Avenue, Kooyong Road, Glen Eira Road, and Hotham Street (the continuation of Williams Road).

Formerly Elsternwick covered the area located in the City of Bayside bounded by Head/Bridge Street, Nepean Highway, Glen Huntly Road and St. Kilda Street. This includes the cricket ground (originally the home of the Elsternwick Cricket Club) and currently known as the Sportscover Arena. It is located within the larger area known as Elsternwick Park – located at the junction of the Nepean Highway and Glen Huntly Road – as is the former Elsternwick Park Golf Course.

Name

In the same way that Ripponlea took its name from the Rippon Lea Estate of Sir Frederick Sargood, Elsternwick took its name from the largest property in the district: Charles Ebden's house Elster (Elster is German for ""). The area was previously known as Red Bluff.

The creek nearby became known as the Elster Creek; and, when a village grew up on the creek, the Anglo-Saxon suffix 'wick', meaning village, was added.

History

The Elsternwick village was proposed in 1851 . Elsternwick was originally situated across three municipalities - Caulfield, Brighton and St Kilda. At the end of the 1880s unsuccessful attempts were made for Elsternwick to become administratively independent. Today it is in the Local Government Area of the City of Glen Eira. The postcode is 3185.

Elsternwick village was surveyed in 1856, and Elsternwick Post Office opened on 22 June 1860.

In 1861 a railway line, operated by the Melbourne & Hobson's Bay Railway Company, was built from Melbourne to Brighton which included a railway station at Elsternwick. The first site of Caulfield Grammar School, founded in 1881, was adjacent to the Elsternwick railway station.

In the 1880s, Elsternwick railway station was also the Melbourne end of the railway line to the large-scale sugar beet processing mill at Rosstown (see Rosstown Railway) – now known as Carnegie – and beyond. This railway was seldom used, and it ceased to function in 1916.

A tramline was opened along Glen Huntly Road in 1889. Another tramline, running between Elsternwick and Point Ormond, was opened on 4 June 1915, and was closed on 22 October 1960.

The ABC studios in Melbourne were located in Gordon Street. The studios were built during the 1950s and 1960s and were decommissioned in 2017. Many programs were filmed and produced in the studios, such as Countdown, Recovery and Adam Hills in Gordon Street Tonight.

Today

Glen Huntly Road in Elsternwick has a variety of cafés and restaurants. Elsternwick was the home of perhaps the best-known brothel in Australia, and certainly Melbourne; Daily Planet, which was the first in the world to be listed on a stock exchange (the Australian Securities Exchange).

Hattam (Mens and Boys Wear) Stores, at 383 Glenhuntly Road, a long, narrow shop, is one of the last locations in Australia that still has a Lamson "Rapid Wire" Cash Carrier in place; it connects three locations in the lower section of the shop with the central cashier's desk.

The 2017 season of The Block was filmed in Regent Street.

Population

In the 2016 Census, there were 10,349 people in Elsternwick. 65.3% of people were born in Australia. The next most common countries of birth were England 3.9%, New Zealand 1.9%, India 1.7%, South Africa 1.7% and China 1.5%.  73.0% of people spoke only English at home. Other languages spoken at home included Greek 2.6%, Hebrew 2.0%, Russian 1.9%, Yiddish 1.8% and Mandarin 1.7%. The most common responses for religion were No Religion 35.5%, Catholic 18.0%, and Judaism 17.8%.

Transport

Elsternwick railway station on the Sandringham railway line is located on Riddell Parade next to Glen Huntly Road. For a number of years (in the late 1800s and early 1900s) it was also where the Rosstown Railway linked up with the Sandringham railway line.

Melbourne tram route 67 links Elsternwick to the Melbourne city centre. It travels along Glen Huntly Road from Carnegie, through Glen Huntly and Caulfield South to Elsternwick and, then, via Brighton Road and St Kilda Road to the CBD, via Swanston Street. It terminates at the University of Melbourne.

Sport
The Elsternwick Club Sandham St est 1919 includes Lawn Bowls on Tiff Dwarf green and various function rooms.

The Elsternwick Cricket Club was founded in August 1901. The Elsternwick Main Oval, now known as Sportscover Arena or Elsternwick Park, was established shortly after the club's foundation. The 'Wickas', as the club is affectionately known, plays in the Victorian Sub-District Cricket Association.

Golfers played at Elsternwick Park Golf Club, also known as Royal Elsternwick, on Glen Huntly Road until 2018, when the course closed to be used as passive open space.

The Elsternwick Croquet Club, founded in 1911, is situated in the Hopetoun Gardens.

Schools

State Schools
The Elsternwick Primary School – once officially located in "Brickwood Street, Elsternwick" – is now, without any shift in its physical position, officially located in Murphy Street, Brighton; and, consequently, the suburb currently has no government schools.

Private Schools
 Wesley College - Elsternwick Campus (formerly: Methodist Ladies' College and Cato College)
 Leibler Yavneh College
 St Joseph's Primary School

Heritage sites

Elsternwick contains a number of heritage-listed sites, including:
 192 Hotham Street: Rippon Lea Estate
 2-4 Selwyn Street: Elsternwick Metropolitan Fire Brigade Station
 84-86 Orrong Road: Union Church
 6-8 Rusden Street: Elsternwick Tram Substation
 296-298 Glenhuntly Road & 1A-1B Riddell Parade: Elsternwick Post Office

Notable Elsternwick people

 Hildred Butler (1906–1975), microbiologist, born in Elsternwick.
 Joan Chambers, née Murray (1930–2016), Member of the Victorian Legislative Assembly, born in Elsternwick.
 "Chris" Christiansen (1913–2007), radio astronomer and electrical engineer, grew up in Elsternwick. 
 Ben Cousins (1978–), former AFL footballer.
 Moira Dynon, née Shelton (1920–1976), welfare worker and scientist, born in Elsternwick.
 Joyce Evans (1929–2019), photographer, artist, gallery director, born in Elsternwick.
 Ray Groom (1944–), lawyer, sportsman, and politician, 39th Premier of Tasmania, born in Elsternwick.
 Joy St. Clair Hester (1920–1960), artist, born in Elsternwick.
 Sir Edwin William Hicks (1910–1984), public servant and diplomat, born in Elsternwick.
 Edward Honey (1885–1922), journalist, born in Elsternwick, suggested the "Two-minute silence" observed on 11 November each year.
 Dave Hughes (1970–), comedian; purchased a house built on The Block 2017.
 Les Johnson (1908–January 1942), Essendon and North Melbourne Footballer, killed in action in World War II, born in Elsternwick.
 William Joynt  (1889–1986), soldier, printer and publisher, born in Elsternwick.
 Geoffrey Lemprière  (1904–1977), woolbuyer and soldier, born in Elsternwick.
 Samuel Mauger (1857–1936), reformer, manufacturer, politician, died in Elsternwick.
 Keith Miller (1919–2004), a resident of Elsternwick in his childhood.
 Enid Moodie-Heddle (1904–1991), poet and children's author, born in Elsternwick.
 Sir Alister Murdoch (1912–1984), air force officer, born in Elsternwick.
 Harold Parker (1892–1917), St Kilda footballer, killed in First World War.
 Bill Ponsford (1900–1991), a resident in the 1920s and 1930s.
 Peter Rowsthorn (1963–), actor and comedian.
 Roy Schilling (1896–1979), politician, died in Elsternwick.
 Percival Serle (1871–1951), accountant, biographer, and bibliographer, born in Elsternwick. 
 George Strickland (1942–), Member of the Western Australian Legislative Assembly, born in Elsternwick.
 Frederick Taylor (1810–1872), squatter and mass murderer.
 Richard Toutcher (1861–1941), politician, died in Elsternwick.
 Sir Alexander George Wales (1885–1962), businessman, politician, Lord Mayor of Melbourne, died in Elsternwick.
 Charlie Watts (1895–1965), soldier and cleric, born in Elsternwick.
 Harry Llewellyn Williams (1915–1961), champion golfer, born in Elsternwick.

Residential architecture

Non-residential architecture

Open space

See also
 City of Caulfield – Elsternwick was previously within this former local government area.
 Rosstown Railway
 Rosstown Railway Heritage Trail

References

External links
 Glen Eira City Council
 Australian Places - Elsternwick
 Elsternwick Traders' Association website - includes a business directory, articles and attractions in Elsternwick

 
Jews and Judaism in Melbourne
Suburbs of Melbourne
Suburbs of the City of Glen Eira
Orthodox Jewish communities
1856 establishments in Australia